PC Joker was the first German-language video gaming magazine for IBM PC-compatible computers. It was published by Joker-Verlag alongside Amiga Joker.

References

Computer magazines published in Germany
Video game magazines published in Germany